Glofate Garcia Buiamba (born 5 January 1999) is an Angolan basketball player who plays for Atlético Petróleos de Luanda of the Angolan Basketball League and .

Early career
In 2017, Buiamba attended an NBA Basketball Without Borders camp in New Orleans.

National team career

Junior level 
Buiamba played for the Angolan under-15 team at the 2015 FIBA Africa Under-16 Championship in Mali. He averaged a team-high 14.9 points and 11.6 rebounds per game in 7 games. One year later, he played with the Angolan under-18 team at the 2016 FIBA Africa Under-18 Championship, winning a gold medal.

Senior level 
Internationally, Buiamba plays for the Angola national basketball team. He played with Angola at FIBA AfroCan 2019 and FIBA AfroBasket 2021.

Awards and accomplishments

International
Angola
FIBA AfroCan  Bronze Medal: (2019 Mali)
Angola U18
FIBA Africa Under-18 Championship  Gold Medal: (Rwanda 2016)

Individual
Angolan Basketball League Fair Play Athlete: (2022)
Angolan Basketball League Best Free Throw Scorer: (2021)

References

External links
Glofate Buiamba at Eurobasket

1999 births
Living people
Atlético Sport Aviação basketball players
G.D. Interclube men's basketball players
Forwards (basketball)
Angolan men's basketball players